

Legislative Assembly elections
Legislative Assembly elections in India were conducted for Andhra State Legislative Assembly in 1955. In Andhra State, Indian National Congress won an absolute majority.

Andhra State*

* : On 1 October 1953, a separate Andhra State, consisting of the Telugu-speaking areas of the composite Madras State, with 167 constituencies with 190 seats in the Assembly, was formed. On 1 November 1956, Andhra State was merged with Hyderabad State under States Reorganisation Act, 1956, to form a single state, Andhra Pradesh. The  districts of Raichur, Gulbarga and the Marathwada district were detached from the Hyderabad State, while merging with Andhra State. In addition, the Siruguppa taluk, the Bellary taluk, the Hospet taluk and a small area of the Mallapuram sub-taluk were transferred from Mysore State to Andhra Pradesh. The districts of Raichur and Gulbarga were transferred to the Mysore State, while the Marathwada district was transferred to the Bombay State. This resulted in re-organization of assembly constituencies of Andhra Pradesh giving way to 85 constituencies with 105 seats in the assembly.

See also
 1954 elections in India
 1957 elections in India

References

External links

 Election Commission of India

1955 elections in India
India
1955 in India
Elections in India by year